Alfonso Alonso Aranegui (born 14 April 1967) is a Spanish politician, member of the People's Party and Minister of Health, Social Services and Equality from 2014 to 2016.

References

1967 births
Health ministers of Spain
Living people
Members of the 9th Congress of Deputies (Spain)
Members of the 10th Congress of Deputies (Spain)
Members of the 11th Congress of Deputies (Spain)
Members of the 12th Congress of Deputies (Spain)
People's Party (Spain) politicians
Politicians from the Basque Country (autonomous community)
People from Vitoria-Gasteiz
Members of the 7th Congress of Deputies (Spain)
Mayors of Vitoria-Gasteiz